Nomopyle is a genus of flowering plants belonging to the family Gesneriaceae.

Its native range is Western South America.

Species
Species:

Nomopyle dodsonii 
Nomopyle peruviana

References

Gesnerioideae
Gesneriaceae genera